The 2004 Bulgarian Supercup was the second Bulgarian Supercup match, a football match which was contested between the 2003–04 A Group champion, Lokomotiv Plovdiv, and the winner of the 2004 Bulgarian Cup Final, Litex Lovech. The match was held on 31 July 2004 at the Lazur Stadium in Burgas, Bulgaria. Lokomotiv beat Litex 1–0 to win their first Bulgarian Supercup.

Match details

References
Gallery of the match Pfl.bg

2004
PFC Lokomotiv Plovdiv matches
PFC Litex Lovech matches
Supercup